Buhay Hayaan Yumabong, more popularly known as Buhay Party-List, is a party-list group in the Philippines founded on October 20, 1999 by Lito Atienza, Melquiades Robles, and El Shaddai founder Mike Velarde. A "pro-life" (anti-abortion) party-list, Buhay is known for its staunch opposition to abortion and birth control in its advocacy for the sanctity of life. The party-list is also known for opposing the death penalty, divorce, same sex marriage, and euthanasia.

In the 2004 elections for the House of Representatives, the party-list group got 705,730 votes (5.5473% of the nationwide party-list vote) and two seats. In the 14 May 2007 election, the party won three seats in the nationwide party-list vote. In the 2010 elections, 1,249,555 votes won for Buhay three seats. Buhay was number three among all elected party-lists in the 2010 elections, after Ako Bicol, which got 1,522,986 votes (winning three seats) and Senior Citizens, which got 1,292,182 votes (also winning three seats).

Today, Buhay Partylist is led by the council of elders supported by multiple congregations and religious groups. The council of elders guides the party on nation-building, democracy, and human rights advocacy. For the 2022 elections, Buhay Party List has enlisted three new nominees: Von Valdepeñas, Mark Brian Paz, and Xavy Padilla.

Von Valdepeñas

First nominee Von Valdepeñas is a businessman, politician and a service-oriented volunteer, who aims to balance his time in the pursuit of social entrepreneurship. Von’s turn to charity focus was mainly influenced by Ateneo while his entrepreneurial mettle was formed at Harvard University in Boston, USA. Moreover, the influence of his father in law Deputy Speaker and former Mayor of Manila Lito Atienza, who is a fierce fighter for the anti-abortion, pro-Catholic movement, has served to sustain and inspire Von to remain steadfast and true to his principles.

As such it is not surprising that he manages his companies with compassion, avoiding the mistakes and pitfalls that far too often leads to capitalism inequality. With humility, as well as the right guidance from a stint as councillor in laguna. His socio-civic organizations such as JCI, he is president of Rotary Aseana, Director Buhay Partylist, Von has forged his company culture leaning towards charity.

Von Valdepeñas is currently the owner of V1 Corporation, a company that operates in industries such as real estate, transportation, construction and trading.  He also spends his time supporting campaigns that helped save the environment, devoting hours to other Non-Government organizations, whose efforts are focused on increased job creation. He has demonstrated selflessness through his devotion to helping the public at large through his numerous collaborations with his wife' Chi Atienza Valdepenas' orphanage: Home for the Angels, which works closely with street children, the LA dance troupe and senior citizen P.O.

In addition, he helped attend rallies against legislation that runs anathema to his stated opposition the death penalty, and extrajudicial killings. Some of his personal programs in Laguna, his home province include anti-drug campaigns, sports programs, job fairs and training and seminars for the youth.

In 2019 he has accepted yet another undertaking: to work full-time as President of Goodwill Philippines, championing the cause of the PWDs. He is humbled and honoured to be chosen to take on such an important responsibility. He has selflessly agreed to do so with no salary, nor deriving any benefit from the organization. Armed with just his fellow member volunteers, and the generosity of its magnanimous donors, Von has now taken on the mission of making Goodwill’s vision of a PWD inclusive Philippines a reality. In October 2021, Von Valdepeñas was voted First Nominee for Buhay Partylist.

Electoral performance

Principal Authored Bills

References

Buhay Party List

Catholic political parties
Party-lists represented in the House of Representatives of the Philippines
Anti-abortion organizations